The 1966 NCAA University Division Golf Championship was the 28th annual NCAA-sanctioned golf tournament to determine the individual and team national champions of men's collegiate golf in the United States.

The tournament was held at the Stanford Golf Course in Stanford, California, hosted by Stanford University.

Two-time defending champions Houston won the team title, the Cougars' ninth NCAA team national title.

Individual results

Individual champion
 Bob Murphy, Florida

Team results

Note: Top 10 only
DC = Defending champions

References

NCAA Men's Golf Championship
Golf in California
NCAA Golf Championship
NCAA Golf Championship
NCAA Golf Championship